Gregory John Norman AO (born 10 February 1955) is an Australian entrepreneur and retired professional golfer who spent 331 weeks as world number one in the 1980s and 1990s. He won 89 professional tournaments, including 20 PGA Tour tournaments and two majors: The Open Championship in 1986 and 1993. Norman also earned thirty top-10 finishes and was the runner-up eight times in majors throughout his career. In a reference to his blond hair, size, aggressive golf style and his birthplace's native coastal animal, Norman's nickname is "The Great White Shark" (often shortened to just "The Shark"), which he earned after his play at the 1981 Masters.

Norman's business interests began during his playing career. He is the chairman and CEO of the Greg Norman Company, a global corporation with a portfolio of companies in fields including apparel, interior design, real estate, wine production, private equity and golf course design. In 2021, he was named CEO of LIV Golf Investments, a start-up company financed by Saudi Arabia's sovereign wealth fund; the LIV Golf Invitational Series of golf tournaments began in 2022.

Norman has donated to and established numerous charities and charity events, like the QBE Shootout which benefits the CureSearch for Children's Cancer fund. He became a Trustee of the Environmental Institute for Golf in 2004 and received the Golf Writers Association of America's Bartlett Award in 2008 for his charitable work.

Early life

Norman was born in Mount Isa, Queensland, Australia to Mervin and Toini Norman. His mother was the daughter of a Finnish carpenter, and his father an electrical engineer. As a youth, he played rugby and cricket and aspired to be a professional surfer. His mother Toini, who had a single-figure handicap, taught the 15-year-old Norman how to golf and allowed him to caddy for her at the Virginia Golf Club in Brisbane. Within about eighteen months, Norman went from a 27 handicap to a scratch handicap. In Townsville, Queensland, Norman attended Townsville Central State School (enrolled 1964) and then Townsville Grammar School then moved on to Aspley State High School on the north side of Brisbane.

Amateur career 
In June 1974, at the age of 19, Norman received media attention at the Queensland Open. The Canberra Times reported that "the young amateur Greg Norman" was one shot off the lead after the first round.

Professional career
As of March 1975, Norman had turned professional. He served as assistant professional under Billy McWilliam OAM at Beverley Park Golf Club in Sydney, New South Wales. Shortly thereafter, in the same year, Norman started work as Charlie Earp's trainee in the Royal Queensland Golf Club pro shop, earning A$38 a week.

Australian and European Tours 
Norman's first four-round professional tournament was the 1976 South Coast Open at Bateman's Bay. In the first round, Norman shot a 68 (−3) to put him in a tie for fifth place, three back of David Good's lead. He followed it up with an even-par 71 to remain in the top ten. In the third round, he "jumped into the reckoning" with a two-under-par 69 which included five birdies on the back nine, one back of the lead. In the final round, he had a chance to win down the stretch but was "edged out" by Barry Burgess. His second tournament was at the following week's Queensland Open. Norman was well back of the lead entering Sunday but shot a final round 70 (−3) to finish in a tie for third. The next week he recorded another top-15 finish at the New South Wales Open. His fourth tournament was the West Lakes Classic held at The Grange Golf Club in Adelaide, South Australia. In the first round, Norman "upstaged his more experienced opponents" to shoot a "brilliant" 64 (−7) to take a three shot lead. In the second round, despite incurring three penalty strokes, Norman shot a four-under-par 67 to expand his lead to five shots. Norman followed it up with a 66 (−5) to create 10 shot lead. On Sunday, however, he had a "fluctuating" final round with six bogeys, six pars, five birdies, and one double-bogey for a 74 (+3). Though David Graham got within four shots Norman held on to win by five. Norman described the win as an "unreal." He later said, "It's been a great experience and now I know what now to do − I think." 

Norman joined the European Tour in the following year and had his first victory in a European event that same season at the Martini International at the Blairgowrie Club in Scotland. In 1980, Norman earned a sizable victory in the French Open, winning the tournament by ten shots. He won the Scandinavian Enterprise Open in Sweden with a course record of 64 in the final round. Later in 1980, Norman won the Suntory World Match Play Championship. Norman also won his first Australian Open that year, his first of five wins in that event.

In 1981, Norman finished in 4th place on his debut at the Masters in Augusta, finishing just three strokes behind the winner Tom Watson. Norman had a victory in the 1981 British Masters and he won his third Martini International tournament that year as well. In 1982, Norman was the leading money winner on the European Tour. He won three European events that year, including successfully defending his British Masters title. The following year, Norman joined the U.S. PGA Tour.

PGA Tour 
In June 1984, Norman won his maiden PGA Tour victory at the Kemper Open, winning by five strokes. He gained worldwide prominence a week later at the 1984 U.S. Open. Norman holed a dramatic 45-foot putt on the 72nd hole to force a playoff with former Masters champion Fuzzy Zoeller. At the next day's 18-hole playoff, Zoeller would earn a 67–75 victory over Norman. He was able to put the defeat behind him with a victory at the Canadian Open the next month in July for his second win of the year.

In 1985, Norman won the Toshiba Australian PGA Championship and the National Panasonic Australian Open. He had two runner-up finishes in the U.S. PGA Tour that year, finishing tied for second place at the Canadian Open and at the Bank of Boston Classic.
In 1986, Norman's 11 worldwide victories that year included four wins in Australia and two regular PGA Tour events; the Panasonic Las Vegas Invitational and the Kemper Open (for the second time) but 1986 is remembered for the Norman Slam or the Saturday Slam. Norman held the lead for all four majors through 54 holes. This meant he played in the final group for every major and had perhaps the best chance in history of winning the single-season Grand Slam. However, the only major victory Norman earned that year was in the 1986 Open Championship at Turnberry.

At the 1986 Masters, Norman began the final round with a one-stroke lead which he maintained until he double-bogeyed the 10th. After making four consecutive birdies on holes 14 to 17, Norman was tied with Jack Nicklaus going to the 18th. Norman missed a par putt on the 18th that would have sent the two into a sudden-death playoff. At the 1986 U.S. Open at Shinnecock Hills, Norman again led after 54 holes. However, Norman faltered on the final day, finishing with a final round 75 placing him six strokes behind the winner, Raymond Floyd.

Norman finally broke through at the 1986 Open Championship for his first major title. Norman shot a second round of 63 on Friday at Turnberry, tying the record for the lowest ever round at the Open. Only 15 players broke par in the second round. Tom Watson described Norman's feat as "the greatest round ever played in a tournament in which I was a competitor." Norman survived the weekend's brutal conditions at Turnberry, with a final round of 69 to win The Open by five shots. After being presented with the Claret Jug trophy, Norman said: "Outside of Australia, Britain was the first place that accepted me as a professional golfer. To win my first Open in front of the British public is the greatest feeling ever." Norman was again in contention at the 1986 PGA Championship. He was in the lead on the final day, but shot a final-round 76 to finish 2 strokes behind the eventual winner, Bob Tway.

Norman's four wins in Australia in 1986 helped him to finish top of the Australian Order of Merit for the fifth time. He also topped the U.S. PGA Tour money list for the first time that year. In September 1986, Norman won the Panasonic European Open at Sunningdale Golf Club and the following month he had another victory in England, winning his third World Match Play Championship at Wentworth. Norman ended 1986 with eleven worldwide victories and was officially ranked number 1 in the brand new Official World Golf Rankings.

Norman endured another setback at the 1987 Masters. In his final round on the 18th green, Norman had a 20-foot putt for a birdie that would win the tournament. The ball trickled over the left lip of the cup, missing by millimetres. After Norman's par on the 72nd hole at Augusta, he found himself in a sudden-death playoff with Larry Mize and Seve Ballesteros. On the second playoff hole, with Ballesteros eliminated, Mize holed a 47-yard (140-foot) chip to win the tournament. Norman did, however, win the Australian Masters in February 1987 and the Australian Open later in the year by a record ten shots at Royal Melbourne Golf Club, beating the previous Australian Open record winning margin of eight strokes by Jack Nicklaus in 1971. Norman's 1987 victory at the Australian Open lifted him back above Seve Ballesteros to the top of the Official World Golf Ranking.

Norman had another four wins in Australia in 1988. In the U.S., Norman won the MCI Heritage Golf Classic at Hilton Head Island, South Carolina, in April 1988, inspired by a leukemia-stricken teenager who got his wish to meet Norman and watch him play. The teenage boy was only supposed to watch the golfer for two rounds, but Norman arranged for him to stay until the tournament's completion. After the tournament, Norman awarded the teenager with the trophy. He was inducted into the Sport Australia Hall of Fame in that year.

At the 1989 Masters, Norman missed a 12-foot par putt on the 72nd hole, which would have put him into a playoff with Nick Faldo and Scott Hoch. Norman had another chance at a major in 1989, this time at the Open Championship at Royal Troon. He played a final round of 64, starting his round with six straight birdies, forcing his way into a playoff with Mark Calcavecchia and Wayne Grady. Going into the final playoff hole, Norman and Calcavecchia were tied, but two successive bunker shots by Norman gave Calcavecchia the victory.

Norman won the Doral-Ryder Open and Memorial Tournament in 1990. He also missed the cut for the first time at Augusta National in the 1990 Masters. In the 1990 Open Championship at St Andrews, Norman began with two rounds of 66, leaving himself sharing the lead with Nick Faldo after 36 holes and the pair four shots ahead of the rest of the field. Faldo then shot a third round of 67, but Norman could only manage 76. Norman finished the tournament tied for sixth place, while Faldo won by five shots. Although 1990 was not Norman's strongest majors year, he finished at the top of the PGA Tour money list for the second time in his career and won the Vardon Trophy and Byron Nelson Award. Later that year, he won the Australian Masters in his home country for a final and record sixth time.
After a career slump in the early 1990s, Norman turned to renowned coach Butch Harmon for help. Together, the two rebuilt Norman's game by solving mechanical problems that had crept into his swing. As a result of this training, Norman earned his second major at Royal St George's in the 1993 Open Championship. There, in ideal conditions, Norman defeated a leaderboard consisting of Nick Faldo, Bernhard Langer and Corey Pavin. Norman's final round 64 was the lowest score by a winner in Open history until Henrik Stenson's 63 at the 2016 Open Championship.

During the following year, 1994, Norman easily beat records for the lowest 18-, 54-, and 72-hole scores at The Players Championship. After opening with a course record-tying 63, he followed with three 67s to give him a final total of 264 strokes, or 24 under par—six strokes better than any previous winner.
Norman finished third at the 1995 Masters and was the runner-up at the 1995 U.S. Open. In June, Norman won his second Memorial Tournament, a victory that marked the beginning of one of his best years on the PGA Tour. After his win at the Canon Greater Hartford Open, aided by a chip-in in for eagle on No. 14 in the final round, Norman overtook Nick Price as the number one golfer in the world. Later, he won the NEC World Series of Golf, holing a 70-foot birdie chip shot to defeat Billy Mayfair and Nick Price in a playoff on the first hole. He ultimately held the No. 1 ranking for 331 weeks in his career. He also topped the money list for the third time and was named PGA Player of the Year.

The following year, Norman opened the 1996 Masters Tournament with a course record-tying 63 which put him at the top of the leaderboard. He held the lead through three days of play. Norman took a six-stroke lead into the final round and lost the tournament to Nick Faldo by five strokes, shooting a Sunday 78 to Faldo's 67. In January 1997, Norman won his largest winner's check to date, one million dollars, when he won the Andersen Consulting World Championship of Golf. Norman then won two tournaments in 1997, but they were his final victories on the PGA Tour. In 1998, Norman missed part of the season after suffering hip and shoulder injuries. He contended in the 1999 Masters tournament, tying for the lead with five holes remaining before finishing third, three strokes behind, and again in the 1999 Open Championship, eventually finishing 6th, three strokes behind.

In July 2008, despite not playing in a major for three years, Norman finished nine over par in a tie for third at The Open Championship after being the 54-hole leader by two strokes. At 53, he set the record in becoming the oldest 54-hole leader in a major championship; a record that would last for just one year, until 59-year-old Tom Watson led the 2009 Open Championship after three rounds.

Champions Tour
Norman turned 50 in February 2005, but has kept his distance from the senior golf circuit. This is due, in part, because of his focus on business, but also because of lingering hip and back issues. In 2003, Norman said: "Hitting about four million golf balls has created unfortunate wear and tear." He had knee surgery in October 2005 and February 2006. Norman believes his back injuries could have been averted had he been introduced to the concept of golf fitness early in his career.

Career achievements and legacy

Norman has earned more than $1 million five times on the U.S. PGA Tour, including three Arnold Palmer Awards as the Tour's leading money winner in 1986, 1990 and 1995. He was also the first person in Tour history to surpass $10 million in career earnings. He has 30 top-10 finishes in majors, or more than 38% of those he has entered. His 20 PGA Tour wins in the 1980s and 1990s ranks second behind Tom Watson (21 total) during this span. He had the lowest total four round score in the history of The Open Championship 267, in 1993, (since broken by Henrik Stenson in 2016), and The Players Championship (264, in 1994).

Norman's dominance over his peers (despite his comparative lack of success in the majors) was probably best expressed in the Official World Golf Rankings: Norman finished the year on top of the ranking list on seven occasions, in 1986, 1987, 1989, 1990, 1995, 1996 and 1997, and was second at the end of 1988, 1993 and 1994. Norman won the PGA Tour of Australia's Order of Merit six times: 1978, 1980, 1983, 1984, 1986 and 1988. He won the European Tour's Order of Merit in 1982, and topped the PGA Tour's money list in 1986, 1990, and 1995. He won the Vardon Trophy for lowest scoring average on the PGA Tour three times: 1989, 1990 and 1994; and was inducted into the World Golf Hall of Fame in 2001.

In 1986, Norman was awarded the BBC Overseas Sports Personality of the Year Award, a feat he replicated in 1993 to join Muhammad Ali as a multiple winner of the award (now also joined by Roger Federer and Usain Bolt). In 2007, Norman was elevated to "Legend" status in the Sport Australia Hall of Fame. He received the 2008 Old Tom Morris Award from the Golf Course Superintendents Association of America, GCSAA's highest honour, at the 2008 Golf Industry Show in Orlando. Norman is a member of The Environmental Institute for Golf's board of trustees and also chairs The institute's advisory council. He was also the recipient of the Golf Writers Association of America's 2008 Charlie Bartlett Award. In 2009 Norman was inducted into the Queensland Sport Hall of Fame.

In 2009, as part of the Q150 celebrations, Greg Norman was announced as one of the Q150 Icons of Queensland for his role as a "sports legend".

In 2015, the PGA of Australia established the Greg Norman Medal, which is awarded to the best Australian male or female golfer in a given year. He also received the Australian Global Icon Award and the National Golf Course Owner's Association Award of Merit both in 2015.

Playing style
Norman had a bold and aggressive style of play. He is widely regarded as one of the best drivers of the golf ball in his era. In the fourteen seasons between 1984 and 1997, Norman finished in the top 20 in total driving on the PGA Tour twelve times and in the top 6 nine times (including first in 1988, 1989 and 1993). When driving long and straight off the tee with a persimmon (wood) clubhead in his prime, Norman intimidated many of his fellow professionals. His high ball flight enabled him to carry the ball very long distances. In 2009, Nick Price said: "The best driver I ever saw was Greg Norman."

Greg Norman Company

Norman founded the Greg Norman Company (originally known as Great White Shark Enterprises (GWSE)) in 1993 after leaving his previous management group, IMG. The now multinational corporation is headquartered in West Palm Beach, Florida. He initially used the Reebok-licensed shark logo for his line of apparel; it now represents over a dozen different businesses. The company reports hundreds of millions of dollars in revenue annually. In 2016, the company changed its branding to become the "Greg Norman Company."

The following is a list of all business properties wholly owned by Great White Shark Enterprises.

Greg Norman Golf Course Design
First established in 1987, Greg Norman Golf Course Design (GNGCD) has been responsible for the creation of over 100 golf courses across the world.

Greg Norman Collection
The Greg Norman Collection began in 1992 after Reebok gave Norman his own line of clothing. It reached $100 million in annual sales in 2005. The collection is composed largely of golf-inspired activewear for men and women.

Greg Norman Estates
Greg Norman Estates is a wine company that produces 14 different varietals from Australia, California, and Argentina. The brand is known for attracting attention from Wine Spectator, having earned the number 8 spot in the world with a 1998 Reserve Shiraz.

Greg Norman Real Estate
The real estate division of the company is responsible for a variety of developments and projects including the Medalist Village in Hobe Sound, Florida. The Greg Norman Design Group is a separate wing of the real estate division that deals in interior design.

Great White Shark Opportunity Fund
The Great White Shark Opportunity Fund is an asset-based, debt-lending fund that invests in public and private small- to mid-cap growth companies throughout the world. The platform offers alternative lending and flex capital.

Shark Wake Park
A joint venture between Norman and his son, Greg Norman, Jr., Shark Wake Park is a brand of wakeboarding complexes. The first park opened in Myrtle Beach, South Carolina in June 2016, and a second, larger park opened in June 2019 in West Palm Beach, Florida.

Shark Experience

Norman launched a connected golf cart in 2017 with partners Verizon, GPSi and Club Car. The cart is equipped with touchscreen display for music and GPS while playing a course.

Greg Norman Eyewear

Debuting in 2011, Greg Norman Eyewear provides sunglasses that are designed for use on the golf course. The brand has a partnership with Aspex Eyewear and is distributed in the United States by Aspex.

Greg Norman Australian Prime
Greg Norman Australian Prime is a branded line of premium Wagyu steaks and other beef products.

Greg Norman Australian Grille
Located in Barefoot Landing in North Myrtle Beach, South Carolina, Greg Norman Australian Grille offers fine dining with an Australian theme.

Non-GWSE properties and partnerships
In addition to the wholly owned companies under the company umbrella, there are also numerous partially owned companies and partnerships. For instance, Norman invested in and became the ambassador for Vancouver-based GPS Industries in 2004. GWSE partnered with Kohlberg & Company to acquire Troon Golf, one of the world's largest golf management companies with over 250 golf courses in its portfolio. Norman is also a leading investment partner in Alchemy Global, a firm that seeks investors for sports startups.

Norman is also the brand ambassador and partner to numerous companies including Qantas (a partnership he's been in since 1976), Cobra Golf, OMEGA, and others.

In 2017, Authentic Brands Group become a controlling partner for the consumer products division of The Greg Norman Company.

Other ventures

LIV Golf Investments 

LIV Golf Investments is led by Greg Norman as CEO. The LIV Golf Invitational Series began in 2022 and consist of seven regular-season events where players compete both individually for points and as part of a team. The series provoked strong resistance from the established PGA Tour and European Tour organisations, including suspensions of players who joined the series, and criticism of its financial backing by Saudi Arabia's Public Investment Fund.

In May 2022 when asked on Sky Sports News about Saudi Arabia's extensive human rights violations and how Norman felt about working for such people he stated: "No they're not my bosses. We're independent, I do not answer to Saudi Arabia, I do not answer to MBS." LIV Golf Investments is on the public record as being under the majority ownership of Saudi Arabia’s Public Investment Fund (PIF). This fund has been controlled by Crown Prince Mohammed bin Salman, Saudi Arabia’s de facto ruler since 2015.

Philanthropy
The QBE Shootout, formerly known as the Shark Shootout, is a PGA Tour team golf event hosted by Greg Norman. The event is played at the Tiburón Golf Club in Naples, Florida. The Shootout benefits CureSearch National Childhood Cancer Foundation. The Greg Norman Golf Foundation was formed by Greg Norman and his father Merv Norman in 1987. The foundation provides professional guidance and instruction throughout Queensland to school students and those in other educational establishments, children with specific physical disabilities, and junior members of golf clubs. The Environmental Institute for Golf the philanthropic arm of the Golf Course Superintendents Association of America (GCSAA), is a collaborative effort of the environmental and golf communities, dedicated to strengthening the compatibility of golf with the natural environment. Norman became a Trustee of the Institute and a member of its advisory council in 2004.

Broadcasting
On 23 April 2014, Fox Sports announced that Norman would join Joe Buck as its lead commentary team for its coverage of the USGA's championships beginning in 2015. However, following criticism of his performance at the 2015 U.S. Open, it was announced in January 2016 that Paul Azinger would replace Norman as the lead golf analyst for Fox Sports.

Autobiography

Norman released his autobiography, titled The Way of the Shark, in 2006.

Personal life
Norman had a brief romance with British tennis player Sue Barker before he met Laura Andrassy, an American flight attendant. Norman married Andrassy in July 1981. They had two children—Greg Norman, Jr. and Morgan-Leigh. They divorced in 2006, with Andrassy receiving a $105 million settlement. He married former World No. 1 tennis player Chris Evert on Paradise Island in the Bahamas in June 2008, but they separated after only 15 months and were subsequently divorced. In November 2010, Norman married interior designer Kirsten Kutner on Necker Island in the British Virgin Islands, with Greg Jr. as his best man. Norman has two grandchildren—Harrison and Hendrix.

In December 2020, Norman was hospitalized with COVID-19. While in hospital, he shared an update on Instagram saying, "It's been an ugly one. I for one am looking forward to getting out of this quarantine and looking forward to building whatever the great future is for 2021 and beyond."

Professional wins (88)

PGA Tour wins (20)

*Note: The 1990 Memorial Tournament was shortened to 54 holes due to rain.

PGA Tour playoff record (4–8)

European Tour wins (14)

European Tour playoff record (1–6)

Japan Golf Tour wins (2)

PGA Tour of Australasia wins (33)

*Note: The 1985 National Panasonic Australian Open was shortened to 54 holes due to rain.

PGA Tour of Australasia playoff record (1–2)

Asia Golf Circuit wins (2)

*Note: The 1983 Cathay Pacific Hong Kong Open was shortened to 36 holes due to rain.

Other wins (19)

Other playoff record (3–1)

Major championships

Wins (2)

Results timeline

CUT = missed the halfway cut (3rd round cut in 1977 and 1980 Open Championships)
WD = withdrew
"T" indicates a tie for a place.

Summary

Most consecutive cuts made: 18 (1981 Masters – 1985 Open Championship)
Longest streak of top-10s: 3 (three times)

The Players Championship

Wins (1)

Results timeline

CUT = missed the halfway cut
WD = withdrew
"T" indicates a tie for a place.

Results in World Golf Championships

1Cancelled due to 9/11

QF, R16, R32, R64 = round in which player lost in match play
"T" = tied
NT = no tournament

Results in senior major championships

CUT = missed the halfway cut
"T" indicates a tie for a place
Note: Norman never played in The Tradition.

Team appearances
Amateur
Australian Men's Interstate Teams Matches (representing Queensland): 1973, 1974

Professional
World Cup (representing Australia): 1976, 1978
Hennessy Cognac Cup (representing the Rest of the World): 1982
Dunhill Cup (representing Australia): 1985 (winners), 1986 (winners), 1987, 1988, 1989, 1990, 1992, 1994, 1995, 1996
Four Tours World Championship (representing Australasia): 1985, 1986, 1987, 1989
Presidents Cup (International team): 1996, 1998 (winners), 2000, 2009 (non-playing captain)
Alfred Dunhill Challenge (representing Australasia): 1995
Wendy's 3-Tour Challenge (representing PGA Tour): 1993, 1994 (winners)

See also
List of celebrities who own wineries and vineyards
List of golfers with most European Tour wins
List of golfers with most PGA Tour wins
List of men's major championships winning golfers
The Vintage Golf Course

References

External links

Australian male golfers
PGA Tour of Australasia golfers
PGA Tour golfers
European Tour golfers
PGA Tour Champions golfers
Winners of men's major golf championships
World Golf Hall of Fame inductees
Golf course architects
Golf writers and broadcasters
LIV Golf
Golfers from Queensland
Sport Australia Hall of Fame inductees
Officers of the Order of Australia
BBC Sports Personality World Sport Star of the Year winners
Queensland Greats
Authentic Brands Group
Australian expatriate sportspeople in the United States
Australian people of Finnish descent
People from Mount Isa
Sportsmen from Queensland
People from Jupiter Island, Florida
1955 births
Living people